Ahmad Ramzy (23 March 1930 – 28 September 2012) was an Egyptian actor who played the leading roles in many Egyptian films in the 1950s, 1960s, and 1970s.

Early life
Ramzy was born Ramzi Mahmud Bayyumi in 1930 to Dr Mahmud Bayumi, an Egyptian orthopedist and university professor father, 

Ramzy graduated from Alexandria's Victoria College where he met someone by the name of Michel Dimitri Challhub who later on was known as Omar Sharif, they became friends since then.
 
After finishing his school, Ramzy joined the Medical school for 3 years, before transferring to the Faculty of Commerce, which he eventually dropped to pursue his career in acting.

Ramzy has one brother, Dr. Hassan Bayoumi, who followed in their father's footsteps and has his practice in London.

Career
Ahmad Ramzy was discovered by Helmy Halim in 15-2-1955, while playing snooker in a club. He was cast by Halim in his first role, as "Ramzy" in Ayyamna al-Holwa (Our Best Days), along with Faten Hamama, Abdel Halim Hafez, and his lifelong friend and schoolmate Omar Sharif, The film was a box office hit. In this film he also starred the first time with very close lifetime friend Abdel Halim Hafez. Next year 1956 saw Ramzy's first starring role in Hob wa Dumoo` (Love and Tears) with Faten Hamama.

The late 1950s were very good to Ramzy, as he participated in many movies and was highly famous for the role of the funny playboy and romantic womanizer, while the 1960s begun, new young actors begun to appear taking more roles of those that Ramzy was playing but that did not stop him from going his way.

By the early 1960s, making films with more than one leading star was in favor, Ramzy teamed up with other stars or younger actors like Hassan Youseff, Youssef Fakhr Eddine, Mohamed Awad and others in a film and the fashion of trio stars films begun with titles like The 3 wild ones, The 3 adventures and more which lasted to early 1970s.
 
During the 1970s, Ramzy began participating in foreign movies shot outside Egypt, He participated in movies produced in Italy (such as Il Figlio di Spartacus (The Son of Spartacus)), Lebanon (such as Fondok El Saada (Hotel of Joy)) and Syria (such as Banat lil Hob (Girls for Love)).
  
Ramzy's active years began to be fade due to age and cinema changing moods, his 1974 film Al Abtal (The Heroes) that co-starred Farid Shawki was notable for the fact it was Egypt's first martial arts film and used the soundtrack of Bruce Lee's Enter the Dragon. By mid 1970s Ramzy was saying goodbye to the cinema as from 1979-1981 saw only two films, then he focused on his trading business, though he was convinced to make a comeback in 1999 in the film " Ket El Saharaa (Desert Cat) followed by a TV series Wajh al-Qamar (Face of the Moon) with Faten Hamama in 2001.

By the entrance of the new millennium, Ramzy participated in another film by the name of El Warda El Hamra (The Red Rose) with actress Yousra and his last appearance was in a TV series called Hanan W Haneen with his eternal friend Omar Sharif, Omar's grandson - Omar Sharif, Jr. and Kareem Hamdy in 2007.

Selected filmography
 Hanan W Hanin (2010, Television) with Omar Sharif
 El Warda El Hamra (The Red Rose) (2002) with Yousra
 Wajh al-Qamar (Face of the Moon) (2001, television) with Faten Hamama
 Hekaya wara kol bab (A Story Behind Every Door) (1979)
 Loghat Al Hob (The Language of Love) (1974) with (Nahed Sherif)
 Al Amaleka (1974) with Nahed Sherif and Samir Sabry
 Al Abtal (The Heroes) (1974) with Farid Shawki and Mona Gabr
 Banat lil Hob (Girls for Love) (1973)
 El Bahth An Fedihah (1973) with Adel Emam, Samir Sabry, and Mervat Amin
 Adwaa Al Madina (City Lights) (1972) with Shadia and Ahmad Mazhar
 Fondok El Saada (Hotel of Joy) (1971)
 Thartharah fawqa al-Nīl (Adrift on the Nile) (1971)
 Al Saat Al Akhira (The Last Hours) (1970) with Nabila Ebeid, Yousif Shaaban and Nawal Abou El Fetouh
 Al Saat Al Raheeba (The Terrible Hours) (1970) with Nabila Ebeid, Yousif Shaaban and Nawal Abou El Fetouh
 Harebat Men El Hob (Escaping from Love) (1970) with Mervat Amin  and Nabila Ebeid
 Heya Wa Al Shayateen (She and the Devils) (1969) with Shams El BarudyThalath Nessaa (Three Women) (1968) with Salah Zulfikar, Mervat Amin, Sabah and Huda Sultan.
 Hawaa Wa El Kerd (Eve and the Monkey) (1968) with Soad Hosny and Mohamed Awad
 Shabab magnoun geddan (Very Crazy Youth) (1967) with Soad Hosny
 Al Asdekaa Al Thalatha (The 3 Friends) (1966) with Mohamed Awad, El Dief Ahmad, and Yousiff Shaaban
 Shakawet Ragala (Awful Men) (1966) with Rushdy Abaza and Soad Hosny
 Al Moghameroon Al Thalatha (The Three Adventurers) (1966) with Soad Hosny, Hassan Yousiff, and Mohamed Awad
 Laylat El Zefaf (The Wedding Night) (1966) with Soad Hosny and Ahmad Mazhar
 Shaket El Talaba (The Students' Apartment) (1966) with Soad Hosny, Rushdy Abaza, and Hassan Yousiff
 Hikayat al-'Omr Kolloh(Story of a Lifetime) (1965) with Farid al-Atrash and Faten Hamama
 AL Ibn Al Mafkood (The Lost Son) (1965) with Amal Farid and Nagwa Foad
 Eeterafat Zog (Confessions of a Husband) (1965) with Fouad el-Mohandes, Youssef Wahbi, Shwikar and Hind Rostom
 Sobyan We Banat (Boys and Girls) (1965) with Nahed Sherief
 El Ainab el murr (Sour Grapes) (1965)with Lobna Abdel Aziz
 Akher Shakawa (Frivolous Youth) (1964) with Hassan Youssif, Mohamed Awad, and Zizi El Badrawy
 Awal Hob (First Love) (1964) with Soad Hosny
 El Naddara el sawdaa (The Dark Glasses) (1963) with Nadia Lutfi and Ahmad Mazhar
 La Tutf'e al-Shams (The Sun Will Never Set) (1962)
 Il Figlio di Spartacus (TheSlave(1962 film)) (1962) as Mardok
 El Akh el kabir (The Big Brother) (1959) with Farid Shawki and Hind Rostom
 Forever Yours (1959)
 Seraa maal hayat (Struggle for Life) (1958)
 Ismail Yassin Fee El Ostool (Ismail Yassin in the Navy) (1957)with Ismail Yasin
 Ibn Hameedo (The Son of Hameedo) (1957) with Ismail Yasin and Hind Rostom
 Tamr henna (Tamarind) (1957) with Naima Akef, Fayza Ahmad and Rushdy Abaza
 Banat el yom (Girls of Today) (1957) with Abdel Halim Hafez and Magda El Sabahy
 El Wessada el khalia (The Empty Pillow) (1957) with Abdel Halim Hafez and Lobna Abdel Aziz
 Al-Qalb Lahu Ahkam (The Heart Has Its Reasons) (1956) with Faten Hamama
 Hob wa Dumoo` (Love and Tears) (1956) with Faten Hamama
 Sira` Fi al-Mina (Dark Waters) (1956) with Omar Sharif and Faten Hamama
 Ayyamna al-Holwa (Our Best Days)'' (1955) with Abdel Halim Hafez, Omar Sharif and Faten Hamama

References
 Al-Ahram Weekly article on Ahmad Ramzy
 Yalla Cinema biography
 Facebook

External links
 

Egyptian male film actors
1930 births
2012 deaths
Victoria College, Alexandria alumni
Egyptian male television actors
Egyptian people of Scottish descent